Parchondromorpha is a genus of millipedes belonging to the family Paradoxosomatidae.

The genus has cosmopolitan distribution.
???The species of this genus are found in Europe and Northern America.

Species:

Parchondromorpha coonoorensis 
Parchondromorpha indica 
Parchondromorpha similis

References

Paradoxosomatidae